Layton is a masculine given name which may refer to:

 Layton Freborg (born 1933), American politician
 Layton Kor (1938–2013), American rock climber
 Layton Maxwell (born 1979), Welsh footballer
 Layton Williams (born 1994), English actor

See also
 Layton (surname)
 Layton (disambiguation)
 Lleyton (given name)
 Leighton (given name)

English-language masculine given names